Tremmel is a surname. Notable people with the surname include:

Anton Tremmel (born 1994), German alpine ski racer
Gerhard Tremmel (born 1978), German footballer and scout
Mark Tremmel (born 1971), American politician

See also
Remmel

Surnames from nicknames